Wealth One Bank of Canada (stylized as WealthONE) is a Canadian Schedule I bank opened in 2016 with a focus on providing services to Chinese-Canadians. It provides banking services online and through retail offices in Toronto, Ontario, and in Vancouver, British Columbia.

History 
Wealth One Bank of Canada was founded by seven key investors. Shenglin Xian attracted other investors, including Yuansheng Ou Yang and Mao Hua Chen, who became directors of the bank. With one other key investor, they raised $50 million as an initial funding for the bank. The investors believed that there was a business opportunity to create a Canadian financial institution that was able to offer services to Chinese-Canadians by understanding their culture, traditions and being able to speak their language. The company began working in the early 2010s towards gaining a charter through what its CEO and president at the time, Charles Lambert, described as a "long application process".

On July 22, 2015, WealthONE received its tentative letters patent from Canada's Minister of Finance. The bank was officially chartered federally in 2016 as a Schedule I bank under the Bank Act. As such, it is regulated by the Office of the Superintendent of Financial Institutions (OSFI) and is a member of the Canada Deposit Insurance Corporation, a Crown corporation which insures all deposits into its member banks.

In November 2016, The Globe and Mail published an article claiming that the banks website included inaccurate profiles of its key investors and that its founder previously faced allegations of mishandling client insurance claims. WealthONE responded in letter stating that "like every other Schedule 1 bank in Canada, Wealth One Bank had to go through an exacting and rigorous process under the Bank Act and OSFI... We're very proud of the fact that [WealthONE] met those stringent standards."

The bank has office locations in the Toronto and Vancouver areas. It first began providing mortgages and loans, and soon after began accepting deposits in July 2016. It hopes to attract new immigrant customers who "may have a solid net worth, just not the kind of proof of income or credit ratings that [other] domestic lenders may prefer." The bank's customer-facing staff are of Chinese descent and able to interact with customers in English, Cantonese and Mandarin.

In October 2020, Paul Leonard was appointed as the new chief executive officer and president of the bank. Leonard first joined WealthONE as CFO in 2018. As CEO, he reported that the bank has about 700 borrowers, 7,000 deposit accounts, and $375 million in total assets as of November 2020.

References

External links 
 

Banks of Canada
2016 establishments in Canada
Banks established in 2016
Organizations based in Toronto
Organizations based in Vancouver